Cartwright High School was located in Blackstock, Ontario within the Durham District School Board. The school had approximately 115 students in grades 9–12. The school closed in June 2013.

Feeder schools 
Cartwright Central Public School

See also

List of high schools in Ontario

External links 
 Cartwright High School

High schools in the Regional Municipality of Durham
1924 establishments in Ontario
2013 disestablishments in Ontario
Educational institutions established in 1924
Educational institutions disestablished in 2013